Dylan Ryan (drummer) (born 1979 in Chicago, Illinois) is an American drummer and composer. He led the progressive-jazz sextet, Herculaneum, and the Los Angeles-based guitar, bass, and drums trio, Dylan Ryan / Sand. 
He is a founding member, along with Dave (The Diminisher) McDonnell, of Chicago's experimental rock trio, Michael Columbia. He has also performed with Icy Demons, Tim Kasher, Cursive, and Rainbow Arabia.

Dylan Ryan's drumming style with Sand has been compared to Ginger Baker, John Bonham, and Stewart Copeland. In January 2013, Dylan Ryan / Sand released their debut album, Sky Bleached on Cuneiform Records. The second Dylan Ryan / Sand recording, Circa, was released on Cuneiform Records in September 2014.

In 2017, Dylan Ryan formed a new band called Ether Feather and released an E.P. entitled Other Memory. In 2019, Ether Feather released their follow-up album, Devil Shadowless Hand.

Dylan Ryan joined Man Man in 2018 under the moniker Jazz Diesel.

Selected Discography 
Ether Feather
Devil Shadowless Hand - 2019
Other Memory - 2017

Dylan Ryan / Sand
Circa - Cuneiform Records, 2014
Sky Bleached - Cuneiform Records, 2013

Herculaneum
UCHŪ - 2012
Olives & Orchids - 2010
III - Clean Feed Records, 2009
Orange Blossom - 482 Music, 2006

with Man Man
Beached/Witch (single) - Sub Pop, 2019

with Tim Kasher
No Resolution - 15 Passenger, 2017
Adult Film - Saddle Creek, 2013

with Icy Demons
Miami Ice - 2008 
Tears of a Clone - 2006

Michael Columbia
These are Colored Bars (2004)
Stay Hard (2006)

with Rainbow Arabia
FM Sushi - Kompakt, 2013

with The Diminisher
Imaginary Volcano - 2006

References

External links 
Official Site 
Herculaneum Official Site

Dylan Ryan / Sand on Cuneiform Records
Rainbow Arabia artist page on Time No Place
12 O'Clock Track: Sand, "White Nights"
Washington Post Critics Notebook/Critics Pick of Dylan Ryan / Sand
Dylan Ryan, Istanbul Cymbals artist
Dylan Ryan, ProMark artist
Jazz Times review of Herculaneum's UCHŪ
Icy Demons Interview with Dylan Ryan

1979 births
Living people
Avant-garde jazz musicians
American jazz drummers
American rock drummers
Musicians from Chicago
Cuneiform Records artists
20th-century American drummers
American male drummers
Jazz musicians from Illinois
21st-century American drummers
20th-century American male musicians
21st-century American male musicians
American male jazz musicians